Hatem Yassen ( Ḥātam Yāsīn; born 21 August 1986) is a former Egyptian professional snooker player. Yassen turned professional in 2015 winning the African Championship.

Career
In 2015, Yassen beat fellow countryman and former professional Mohamed Khairy 6–5 in the final of the African Championship. The win gained him a two-year card on the World Snooker Tour for the 2015–16 and 2016–17 seasons. He lost all six matches he played during the season and failed to pick up a frame in four of them. It was a similar story the following season as he lost all eight matches he played and he has now dropped off the tour.

Performance and rankings timeline

Career finals

Amateur finals: 1 (1 title)

References

External links
 Hatem Yassen at CueTracker.net: Snooker Results and Statistic Database
Hatem Yassen at worldsnooker.com

Egyptian snooker players
Living people
1986 births